Charles Albert Harrison (5 February 1915 – 4 June 1986) (nickname Chookey) was an Australian politician. He represented the South Australian House of Assembly seat of Albert Park from 1970 to 1979 for the Labor Party.

Married to Elsie Rose Sanders.

Son of Charles and Lillian Harrison née Atkinson.

Buried in Lawn section of Cheltenam Cemetery.

References

1915 births
1986 deaths
Members of the South Australian House of Assembly
Australian Labor Party members of the Parliament of South Australia
20th-century Australian politicians